Bùi Quốc Bảo, stagename simply Quốc Bảo (born June 30, 1967) is a Vietnamese songwriter and record producer. He became a prominent songwriter in Vietnam in the late 1990s and noted as producer who helps launch new artists.

References

External links
 Quốc Bảo's minihome on Cyworld Vietnam
 online music
 Quốc Bảo's blog
 articles on Quốc Bảo in Vietnamese

1967 births
Living people
Vietnamese record producers
Vietnamese guitarists
Vietnamese songwriters